Lilly Adong (born on 2 February 1976) is a Ugandan politician and member of Parliament since 2011, she serves as a woman representative in the Parliament of Uganda for the Nwoya district.

She is an independent politician.

Education 
Adong earned her Bachelor's degree of arts in education at Makerere University in 2000. In 2003, she was awarded a diploma in strategic environmental education from the Institute of Housing & Urban Development Studies in Rotterdam.

Later in 2005, she earned a certificate in law at the Law Development Center in Kampala. In 2008, she did a postgraduate diploma in conflict management and peace studies at Gulu University. In 2010 she did a postgraduate diploma in public administration and management at the Uganda Management Institute. She did a masters of public administration and management studies at the Uganda Management Institute in 2014.

Other responsibilities 
She served as a District Disaster Preparedness Coordinator in the office of the prime minister in Amuru District from 2009 to 2010

In 2003–2009, she served as a Senior Assistant Secretary in Amuru and Gulu District local governments.

From 2006 to 2007, she served as a clerk to council (Amuru district local government).

References 

1976 births
Living people
Makerere University alumni
Gulu University alumni
Women members of the Parliament of Uganda
Members of the Parliament of Uganda
21st-century Ugandan politicians
21st-century Ugandan women politicians